Zavan (also Romanized as Zavān and Zāvon; also known as Zavān Jey and Zūn) is a village in Jey Rural District, in the Central District of Isfahan County, Isfahan Province, Iran. At the 2006 census, its population was 844, in 229 families.

References 

Populated places in Isfahan County